Sharad Tripathi (9 January 1972 – 30 June 2021) was a member of the Bharatiya Janata Party (BJP) from the state of Uttar Pradesh. He was elected to Lok Sabha from Sant Kabir Nagar constituency in the 2014 general election.

Education 
He completed his Post Graduation from Kanpur University in 1995.

Personal life 

Tripathi was son of Ramapati Ram Tripathi, former president of the BJP state unit of Uttar Pradesh. He died in 2021, following a lengthy illness. 
Prime Minister Narendra Modi, 
Union Home Minister Amit Shah and Uttar Pradesh Chief Minister Yogi Adityanath paid condolences.

Political career

May 2014: Elected to 16th Lok Sabha
1 Sep 2014 onwards: Member, Standing Committee on External Affairs; Member, Consultative Committee, Ministry Of Rural Development, Panchayati Raj and Drinking Water and Sanitation
12 June 2017 onwards: Member, House Committee

Controversies
On 6 March 2019, Sharad Tripathi was seen assaulting BJP MLA Rakesh Singh Baghel with his shoe after he discovered that his name was missing from the foundation stone of a new road.

References

1972 births
2021 deaths
India MPs 2014–2019
People from Sant Kabir Nagar district
Lok Sabha members from Uttar Pradesh
Bharatiya Janata Party politicians from Uttar Pradesh
Chhatrapati Shahu Ji Maharaj University alumni
Deaths from the COVID-19 pandemic in India